The Mauritius Trade Union Congress (MTUC) is a national trade union center in Mauritius. It was founded by Emmanuel Anquetil in 1946. MTUC is affiliated with the International Trade Union Confederation.

References

External links
 MTUC Official site.

Trade unions in Mauritius
International Trade Union Confederation
Trade unions established in 1946